2nd Medical Regiment, Royal Army Medical Corps, is the task Medical Regiment of 102 Logistic Brigade.

History

2nd Medical Regiment was officially formed on 4 July 2008 following the amalgamation of (A)29 Squadron and (B)28 Squadron of 1 Close Support Medical Regiment. The regiment was based at Bergen-Hohne Garrison in Germany from its inception.

In March 2009, the regiment was deployed to Afghanistan on its first full operational deployment, contributing to Operation Herrick as the major component of the Joint Force Medical Group. The majority of the regiment was deployed to Helmand Province, with detachments in Kandahar and Kabul. The regiment returned to Hohne in October 2009.

In June 2015, 2nd Medical Regiment was reformed to Adaptable Force (AF) under Army 2020 and were re-based to St George's Barracks in Rutland, North Luffenham. 2nd Medical Regiment are "hybrid" in nature, with one Medical Squadron (29 Medical Squadron) being a full-time regular deployable Squadron, with two Area Support (Reserve) Squadrons based in Leicester and Hull.

2nd Medical Regiment serves 1st (United Kingdom) Division and is part of the Allied Forces Medical Group under 102 Logistic Brigade.

In June 2015, the regiment marched out of Hohne Garrison to complete its re-basing. After returning from Germany, the regiment relocated to St George's Barracks, North Luffenham.

The regiment deployed to Kenya in summer 2018 to take part in Exercise Askari Serpent 2018 delivering medical care to the local population.

The regiment remained at St George's Barracks until late 2018.

A written statement in December 2016 stated that it will be rationalised, with all manpower in this unit being redeployed to other areas of the British  Army.

References

External links
 Website 

02
Military units and formations established in 2008